Donald Masike'Vanua Kalpokas (23 August 1943 – 20 March 2019) was a Vanuatuan politician and diplomat who twice served as Prime Minister of Vanuatu.

Biography
Kalpokas was born on Efate island. Along with Walter Lini, he founded the Vanua'aku Pati. This political party promoted socialist policies as well as supporting and promoting political independence for Vanuatu. In 1983, Kalpokas became foreign minister of Vanuatu but forfeited his position after a few months. He became foreign minister again in 1987 and remained in this post for a full four-year tenure.

On 6 September 1991, Kalpokas and other members of the Vanua'aku Pati defected from Lini's government and supported a no-confidence vote against him. Kalpokas then became an interim Prime Minister until the next parliamentary elections. The elections resulted in the opposition Union of Moderate Parties taking control of the government, and Kalpokas left office on 16 December 1991.

In March 1998, following parliamentary elections, which resulted in gains for the Vanua'aku Pati and Lini's National United Party, Kalpokas and Lini formed a coalition government. Kalpokas took office as prime minister again on 30 March 1998. He also became a foreign minister for the third time but soon gave up his post. The government collapsed in November 1999 when Kalpokas resigned as prime minister to prevent a no-confidence vote.

In 2001, after nearly a decade as leader of the Vanua'aku Pati, Kalpokas gave up the party leadership. He served as Speaker of the Parliament from May 2001 to May 2002. In August 2004, he was a candidate to become President of Vanuatu, and received 26 votes in the first round but then withdrew as it became clear that he would not be able to gain enough support.

In November 2007, he was appointed Vanuatu's Permanent Representative to the United Nations.

Kalpokas died on 20 March 2019, at the age of 75.

References

External links

 KALPOKAS, Donald International Who's Who. accessed 4 September 2006.
 Index Ka Rulers.org. accessed 4 September 2006.

1943 births
2019 deaths
Prime Ministers of Vanuatu
Speakers of the Parliament of Vanuatu
Foreign Ministers of Vanuatu
Members of the Parliament of Vanuatu
People from Shefa Province
Vanuatuan socialists
Permanent Representatives of Vanuatu to the United Nations
Vanua'aku Pati politicians